Matthew McHale is a Scottish boxer. He competed at the 2022 Commonwealth Games in the boxing competition, being awarded the bronze medal in the men's bantamweight event. He had previously competed at the 2021 AIBA World Boxing Championships in the bantamweight event, but without winning a medal.

References

External links 

Living people
Place of birth missing (living people)
Year of birth missing (living people)
Scottish male boxers
Bantamweight boxers
Boxers at the 2022 Commonwealth Games
Commonwealth Games bronze medallists for Scotland
Commonwealth Games medallists in boxing
Medallists at the 2022 Commonwealth Games